EuroVelo is a network of currently 17 long-distance cycling routes criss-crossing Europe, in various stages of completion. EuroVelo is a project of the European Cyclists' Federation (ECF).

EuroVelo routes can be used for bicycle touring across the continent, as well as by local people making short journeys. The routes are made of both existing national bike routes — such as the Dutch LF-Routes, the German D-Routes, the French véloroute "SN3V" and the British National Cycle Network — and existing general purpose roads, together with new stretches of cycle routes to connect them.

History 
The idea of creating a network of international cycle routes spanning Europe started in 1990. It was initially coordinated by the ECF, De Frie Fugle (Denmark) and Sustrans (UK) and the original plan was to create 12 long-distance cycling routes.

Since August 2007, the ECF has assumed full responsibility for the project. Despite sometimes tight financial constraints, the EuroVelo project has already begun to fulfil the vision of its founders with sections of the network being implemented in countries as far apart as Finland, Cyprus, Spain and the UK.  In addition, the EuroVelo brand has become widely known.

There have been various changes to the network over the years, most notably the addition of two new routes — EuroVelo 13 (the Iron Curtain Trail) and EuroVelo 15 (the Rhine Cycle Route) — in September 2011, which are the longest and shortest of the EuroVelo routes.

Main points on the EuroVelo routes

 Routes EV10 and EV12 are a circular tour
 Connections to other EV routes are in parentheses
 Odd routes are heading north–south, even routes are heading west–east

Route information

EuroVelo 1 – Atlantic Coast Route

Stretching the length of the continent, from North Cape, Norway to Algarve, Portugal, EV1 connects Norway, Scotland, Ireland, Wales, the West Country of England, France, Spain and Portugal.

EuroVelo 2 – Capitals Route

EV2 runs between Galway, Ireland to Moscow, Russia visiting some capital cities along the way, from Eyre Square to Red Square.

Between The Hague in the Netherlands and the German-Polish border, the EV2 follows the bicycle route called European Bicycle Route R1 or Euro-Route R1, an international long-distance cycling route connecting Boulogne-sur-Mer in France with St Petersburg in Russia.

EuroVelo 3 – Pilgrims Route

EV3 goes from Trondheim in Norway to Santiago de Compostela in Spain. The route follows traces of old roads used for pilgrimages in the Middle Ages. The route passes through Norway, Sweden, Denmark, Germany, Belgium, France and Spain. Most of these countries have a developed net of bicycle routes used as part of EV3.

EuroVelo 4 – Central Europe Route 
The EV4 goes from Roscoff, France to Kyiv, Ukraine, going through France, Belgium, The Netherlands, Germany, Czechia, Poland, and Ukraine.

EuroVelo 5 – Via Romea Francigena

The EV5 route is inspired by the Via Francigena, a pilgrimage route from London to Rome first recorded by Archbishop of Canterbury Sigeric in the 10th century AD. However, the route of the true Via Francigena is an almost straight line path from London to Rome, while the EuroVelo 5 route takes a more easterly route that passes through Brussels, Luxembourg and Strasbourg in the Alsace. It then follows the Franco-German border, passes through Switzerland following Swiss National Bike Route no. 3, before crossing the Alps at the Gotthard Pass. It then passes through Italy (more closely following Sigeric's route) to Rome before continuing on to the Adriatic port city of Brindisi.

EuroVelo 6 – River Route

Running from Saint-Nazaire on the mouth of the river Loire along that river eastward through France, EV6 passes over the border to Switzerland to Lake Constance and then on to Tuttlingen in Germany, where it begins its way down the Danube following the Donauradweg (Danube Cycle Route). It follows that river, Europe's second longest, through Germany, Austria, Slovakia, Hungary, Serbia, Bulgaria and Romania to the river's mouth at the Danube Delta. It then continues southwards to end in Constanța, on the Black Sea.

EuroVelo 7 – Sun Route

EV7 runs from the North Cape to Malta. It goes through Norway, Finland, Sweden, Denmark, Germany, Czechia, Austria, Italy, and Malta.

EuroVelo 8 – Mediterranean Route

EV8 follows the European coastline of the Mediterranean sea from Cádiz, Spain to Athens, Greece, going through Spain, France, italy, Slovenia, Croatia, Bosnia and Herzegovina, Montenegro, Albania, Greece, Turkey, and Cyprus.

EuroVelo 9 – Amber Route

EV9 (in Poland, also labeled as R9) stretches from the Baltic Sea to the Adriatic Sea. It is so named after the precious stone amber collected in the Baltic, which was taken by routes such as this to the Mediterranean. One of the shortest of the EuroVelo routes, EV9 still manages to cut across Europe from north to south, from Poland to Croatia, and in doing so passes through the Czech Republic, Austria and Slovenia en route.

EuroVelo 10 – Baltic Route

EV10 runs around Baltic Sea. Some of its parts are mapped on OpenStreetMap project . On the state of the route there is an OpenStreetMap wiki page

EuroVelo 11 – East Europe Route

EV11 connects (theoretically) the Norway's North Cape with Athens.

EuroVelo 12 – North Sea Route

EV12 was the first European route, opened in June 2001,  route through England, Scotland, Norway, Sweden, Denmark, Germany, the Netherlands and Belgium. It features in the Guinness Book of Records as the longest unbroken signposted cycling route. It was funded in part by the European Union's Interreg initiative.

EuroVelo 13 – Iron Curtain Trail

EuV13 follows the old Iron Curtain, the divided borders of Europe during the Cold War. The ICT runs from Kirkenes, Norway on the Barents Sea, along the Finno-Russian border through to the Baltic Sea, then hugs the length of the Baltic coast to Lübeck in Germany. It then follows the old border between West Germany and the former East Germany, the current borders between the Czech Republic and both Germany then Austria, the Austrian-Slovak and Austrian-Hungarian borders before following the borders of Romania, the former Yugoslavia, Bulgaria and North Macedonia. It finishes at Rezovo in Bulgaria on the Black Sea after following the border with Greece and Turkey.

EuroVelo 15 – The Rhine Cycle Route

EV15, with an overall length of about  passes through four countries from the headwaters of the Rhine in Andermatt in the Swiss Alps to the estuary in Rotterdam in the Netherlands, via France  and Germany.

EuroVelo 17 – Rhone Cycle Route 

It starts in Andermatt and runs along each side of Lake Geneva before crossing into France. Passing through Lyon and Avignon, it forks into sections which end in Montpellier and Marseille.

EuroVelo 19 – Meuse Cycle Route 
It follows one of the most significant rivers in Europe, from the source of the Meuse on the Langres plateau in France, heading north into Belgium and on to the river mouth at Hook of Holland, with the route ending in the Dutch port city of Rotterdam.

Requirements
The ECF has written a route development manual for those working on developing EuroVelo routes. According to the guidelines, all EuroVelo routes should fulfill the following criteria:
 They must be based on existing or planned national or regional routes of the involved countries.
 At least two countries must be involved.
 Route length must be at least .
 Steep sections should be avoided wherever possible and for very steep sections (if unavoidable) alternative transport options (i.e. public transport or alternative routes) should be provided.
 Easy to communicate - internationally recognisable identity and name (marketing potential).
 Implementation plans in place (project plan, business plan, partners).
 Signing in accordance with the regulations of the respective nations and/or regions, continuous and in both directions.
 Signage supplemented by EuroVelo route information panels, in accordance with the recommendations of UNECE and the ECF's Signing of EuroVelo cycle routes manual.

Route infrastructure
The current share of route infrastructure components in the EuroVelo network is as follows:
 Bicycle path/lane: 14%
 Traffic-free asphalted road: 8%
 Traffic-free non-asphalted road: 6%
 Public low-traffic, asphalted road: 56%
 Public non-asphalted road: 3%
 Public high-traffic, asphalted road: 14%

See also 
 European long-distance paths
 Outline of cycling
 Route Verte
 United States Bicycle Route System
 Cyclability

References

External links 

EuroVelo — the European Cycle Route Network
ECF European Cyclists' Federation
Eurovelo 13: Iron Curtain Trail - Through Europe along the former Iron Curtain
Eurovelo 15 from Andermatt to Rotterdam
Mapping project of EuroVelo on OpenStreetMap
Italian Greenways

Mobile Apps 
 Iphone App EuroCycle - Offline Maps for EuroVelo Cycle Routes

 
Cycleways in Europe
Transport in Europe